Eva Jessye (January 20, 1895 – February 21, 1992) was an American conductor who was the first black woman to receive international distinction as a professional choral conductor. She is notable as a choral conductor during the Harlem Renaissance. She created her own choral group which featured widely in performance. Her professional influence extended for decades through her teaching as well. Her accomplishments in this field were historic for any woman. She collaborated in productions of groundbreaking works, directing her choir and working with Virgil Thomson and Gertrude Stein on Four Saints in Three Acts (1933), and serving as musical director with George Gershwin on his innovative opera Porgy and Bess (1935).

Early life and education
Eva Jessye was born January 20, 1895, in Coffeyville, Kansas. She was educated at Western University, a historically black university in Kansas, and Langston University in Oklahoma. She later studied privately with Will Marion Cook in New York City.

In 1919, Jessye began work as the choir director at Morgan State College in Baltimore. She returned west for a time to teach at an AME Church school in Oklahoma. In 1926, she went back east to Baltimore, where she began to perform regularly with her group, the "Eva Jessye Choir". She had first named them the "Original Dixie Jubilee Singers", but many groups began to appropriate the name, Dixie Jubilee Singers, so she changed hers.

She and the group moved to New York, where they appeared frequently in the stage show at the Capitol Theatre, where Eugene Ormandy conducted the orchestra. They were also frequent performers on NBC and WOR radio in New York in the 1920s and 1930s. They recorded on Brunswick, Columbia, and Cameo records in the 1920s. In 1929, Jessye went to Hollywood as the choral director for the MGM film Hallelujah!, which had an all-black cast directed by King Vidor. She received praise from members of the black press when she spoke out against the discriminatory practices that she endured while on the set for this film.

In New York, Jessye worked with creative multi-racial teams in groundbreaking productions that experimented with form, music and stories. In 1933, she directed her choir in Virgil Thomson's and Gertrude Stein's opera, Four Saints in Three Acts, produced as a Broadway theatre work. According to Steven Watson, the Eva Jessye Choir's participation in Four Saints, represented a musical and economic breakthrough for African-American singers at the time. Watson quotes Jessye, describing Four Saints as "quite a departure, because up to that time, the only opportunities involved things like "Swanee River," or "That's Why Darkies Are Born," or "Old Black Joe." They called that "our music," and thought we could sing those things only by the gift of God, and if God hadn't given us that gift, we wouldn't have any at all....With this opera, we had to step on fresh ground, something foreign to our nature completely." Jessye also demanded that her singers be paid for rehearsal, "fighting a deeply ingrained system of discriminatory salaries, rampant kickbacks, and nonpayment of choruses during rehearsals," writes Watson. In 1935, George Gershwin chose her as his music director for his opera Porgy and Bess.

In 1927, Jessye published My Spirituals, a collection of her arrangements of spirituals, together with stories about growing up in southeast Kansas.

Jessye also composed her own choral works:
 The Life of Christ in Negro Spirituals (1931); 
 Paradise Lost and Regained (1934), a folk oratorio; and 
 The Chronicle of Job (1936).

These are combined spirituals, religious narrative or biblical text, and her orchestral compositions.

An active supporter of the Civil Rights Movement, Jessye and her choir participated in the 1963 March on Washington for Jobs and Freedom.

Active into her 80s, she taught at Pittsburg State University (Pittsburg, Kansas), and the University of Michigan. She donated her extensive collection of books, scores, artwork, and other materials to the University of Michigan, which became the basis of the university's African American Music Collection. Dr. Jessye was a member of Sigma Gamma Rho sorority.

Legacy and honors
Shortly before her death in Ann Arbor, Michigan, she established the Eva Jessye African-American Music Collection at the University of Michigan. She left most of her personal papers to Pittsburg State University in Kansas.

References

Eva Jessye, My Spirituals. Robbins-Engel, 1927.
Eileen Southern, The Music of Black Americans: A History. W. W. Norton & Company; 3rd edition.

External links
https://digitalcommons.pittstate.edu/jessye/, Pittsburg State University.

1895 births
1992 deaths
20th-century African-American women singers
20th-century American composers
20th-century classical composers
20th-century women composers
African-American classical composers
American classical composers
African-American women academics
American women academics
African-American academics
African-American women classical composers
American women classical composers
People from Coffeyville, Kansas
Pupils of Percy Goetschius
University of Michigan faculty